Numerous genetic disorders are caused by errors in fatty acid metabolism. These disorders may be described as fatty oxidation disorders or as a lipid storage disorders, and are any one of several inborn errors of metabolism that result from enzyme defects affecting the ability of the body to oxidize fatty acids in order to produce energy within muscles, liver, and other cell types.

Some of the more common fatty acid metabolism disorders are:

Coenzyme A dehydrogenase deficiencies
 Very long-chain acyl-coenzyme A dehydrogenase deficiency (VLCAD) - Very long-chain acyl-coenzyme A dehydrogenase
 Long-chain 3-hydroxyacyl-coenzyme A dehydrogenase deficiency (LCHAD) - Long-chain 3-hydroxyacyl-coenzyme A
 Medium-chain acyl-coenzyme A dehydrogenase deficiency (MCAD) - Medium-chain acyl-coenzyme A dehydrogenase
 Short-chain acyl-coenzyme A dehydrogenase deficiency (SCAD) - Short-chain acyl-coenzyme A dehydrogenase
 3-hydroxyacyl-coenzyme A dehydrogenase deficiency (HADH) - 3-hydroxyacyl-coenzyme A dehydrogenase

Other Coenzyme A enzyme deficiencies
 2,4 Dienoyl-CoA reductase deficiency - 2,4 Dienoyl-CoA reductase
 3-hydroxy-3-methylglutaryl-CoA lyase deficiency - 3-hydroxy-3-methylglutaryl-CoA lyase
 Malonyl-CoA decarboxylase deficiency - Malonyl-CoA decarboxylase

Carnitine related
 Primary carnitine deficiency - SLC22A5 (carnitine transporter)
 Carnitine-acylcarnitine translocase deficiency - Carnitine-acylcarnitine translocase
 Carnitine palmitoyltransferase I deficiency (CPT) - Carnitine palmitoyltransferase I
 Carnitine palmitoyltransferase II deficiency (CPT) - Carnitine palmitoyltransferase II

Lipid storage

Acid lipase diseases
Wolman disease
Cholesteryl ester storage disease
Gaucher disease
Niemann-Pick disease
Fabry disease
Farber’s disease
Gangliosidoses
Krabbé disease
Metachromatic leukodystrophy

Other
 Spinal muscular atrophy
 Mitochondrial trifunctional protein deficiency
 Electron transfer flavoprotein (ETF) dehydrogenase deficiency (GAII & MADD)
 Tangier disease
 Acute fatty liver of pregnancy

See also 
Fatty acid synthase
Essential fatty acid
Fatty acid metabolism
Orthomolecular medicine

References

External links 

Fatty acids
Fatty